John Morroni (February 16, 1955 – May 20, 2018) was an American politician and businessman. He died while serving on the elected Board of County Commissioners of Pinellas County, Florida.

Biography
Morroni was born in Chicago, Illinois. He graduated from Loyola University Chicago in 1977. In 1980, Morroni moved to Florida and worked in the real estate business. He lived in Clearwater, Florida.

Morroni served in the Florida House of Representatives from 1992 through 2000, when he was elected to the Pinellas County, Florida Board of Commissioners. He became the County Commission chair in 2012. Morroni was a member of the Republican Party.

Morroni was treated for Non-Hodgkin lymphoma in 2008, and a recurrence in 2011. Morroni died from leukemia on May 20, 2018.

References

External links

1955 births
2018 deaths
Politicians from Chicago
People from Clearwater, Florida
Businesspeople from Florida
Loyola University Chicago alumni
County commissioners in Florida
Republican Party members of the Florida House of Representatives
Deaths from cancer in Florida
Deaths from leukemia
20th-century American businesspeople